The 2022 Indonesian motorcycle Grand Prix (officially known as the Pertamina Grand Prix of Indonesia) was the second round of the 2022 Grand Prix motorcycle racing season. It was held at the Mandalika International Street Circuit in Central Lombok on 20 March 2022.

On the Wednesday prior to race weekend, 20 MotoGP riders paraded on race machines through Jakarta city streets together with the Indonesian President Joko Widodo on a road machine.

In the Moto2 class, Somkiat Chantra won the race in mixed conditions after starting from fourth place on the grid. It was both Chantra's and a Thai rider's first victory in Grand Prix motorcycle racing.

Background
The Indonesian Grand Prix returned to the championship calendar after an absence of 25 years at the new Mandalika International Street Circuit in Central Lombok. On the Wednesday prior to race weekend, 20 MotoGP class riders met with Indonesian President Joko Widodo at the Merdeka Palace, then paraded through Jakarta streets on race machines, together with the President who rode a road machine. Roads were closed for the occasion, and fans lined the streets.

Previously, the two world championship events in 1996 and 1997 were held at the Sentul International Circuit.

Riders' entries 
In MotoGP and Moto2 classes the riders and teams were the same as the season entry list with no additional stand-in riders for the race.

In the Moto3 class, as in the Qatar round, Taiyo Furusato missed the round after having surgery due to a right ankle injury; he was not replaced. Gerard Riu replaced David Muñoz as Muñoz was under the minimum age.

MotoGP Championship standings before the race 
After winning the Qatar Grand Prix, Enea Bastianini lead the riders' standings with 25 points, followed by Brad Binder (20), Pol Espargaró (16), Aleix Espargaró (13) and Marc Márquez (11). In the constructors' classification, Ducati lead at 25 points, followed by KTM at 20 points. Honda was third at 16 points, ahead of Aprilia (13), Suzuki (11) and Yamaha (7). In the Team Championship standings, Repsol Honda lead with 27 points, 2 more than Gresini Racing and 7 more than Red Bull KTM Factory Racing. Team Suzuki Ecstar and Aprilia Racing were fourth and fifth, respectively at 19 and 17 points.

Márquez suffered a concussion during the warmup before the race, and had to be transferred to a local hospital in Lombok, thus ruling him out of the race.

Moto2 Championship standings before the race 
The victory of the opening round earned Celestino Vietti the top of the standings, with 25 points; the other riders on the podium, Arón Canet and Sam Lowes, scored 20 and 16 points, with Augusto Fernández and Tony Arbolino fourth and fifth with 13 and 11 points respectively. The constructors' classification was dominated by Kalex with 25 points, with Boscoscuro following with only 1 point. The team championship standings were led by Flexbox HP40 with 29 points, followed by 2 and 4 points respectively by Elf Marc VDS Racing Team and Mooney VR46 Racing Team. Red Bull KTM Ajo was fourth at 17 points, ahead of Idemitsu Honda Team Asia at 10 points.

Moto3 Championship standings before the race 
Andrea Migno, after the victory in Qatar, is first in the riders' standings with 25 points, 4 and 9 more than Sergio García and Kaito Toba, followed by Deniz Öncü and John McPhee with 13 and 11 points. In the constructors' classification, Honda leads with 25 points, followed by Gas Gas (20), KTM (16), Husqvarna (13) and CFMoto (11). In the team championship standings, Gaviota GasGas Aspar Team leads with 28 points, 3 more than the Rivacold Snipers Team; 17 points followed by CIP Green Power and MT Helmets - MSI. Red Bull KTM Tech3 is fifth at 15 points.

Free practice

MotoGP 
In the first session, Pol Espargaró was the fastest, ahead of Miguel Oliveira and Marc Márquez. In the second session, the Yamaha took the lead, with Fabio Quartararo preceding Franco Morbidelli; third was Johann Zarco's Ducati. The third session, held in wet-dry conditions, Marc Márquez finished in the lead, with Francesco Bagnaia and Marco Bezzecchi right behind. In the combined times table, there are some big names who miss the top 10 and are forced to compete in Q1: Pol Espargaró, Marc Márquez, Francesco Bagnaia and Joan Mir.

In the fourth session, the three fastest bikers were Franco Morbidelli, Bezzecchi and Johann Zarco.

Moto2 
Sam Lowes was the fastest in the first session, ahead of Joe Roberts and Tony Arbolino. In the second session, Jake Dixon finished in the lead, with Celestino Vietti and Lowes second and third. The third session, held on a wet track, Fermín Aldeguer set the best time ahead of Augusto Fernández and Dixon.

Moto3 
The first session saw Alberto Surra finish in the lead, with Deniz Öncü and Izan Guevara second and third respectively. In the second session, Andrea Migno preceded Carlos Tatay and Dennis Foggia. Migno was also the fastest in the third session, held on a wet track, ahead of Surra and Tatsuki Suzuki.

Qualifying

MotoGP

 

Notes
  – Franco Morbidelli was penalized by three positions on the starting grid for not following the starting practice procedure correctly. Following the non-participation of Marc Márquez in the race, he gained a position.
  - Marc Márquez had qualified in 14th place, but following his fall in the warm up, the doctors decided that he was unfit to participate in the race.

Moto2

Moto3

Race

MotoGP

 Marc Márquez suffered a head concussion in a crash during warm up and was declared unfit to compete.

Moto2

 Barry Baltus suffered a broken wrist in a crash during qualifying and withdrew from the event.

Moto3

Championship standings after the race
Below are the standings for the top five riders, constructors, and teams after the round.

MotoGP

Riders' Championship standings

Constructors' Championship standings

Teams' Championship standings

Moto2

Riders' Championship standings

Constructors' Championship standings

Teams' Championship standings

Moto3

Riders' Championship standings

Constructors' Championship standings

Teams' Championship standings

Notes

References

External links

2022 MotoGP race reports
Motorcycle Grand Prix
2022
March 2022 sports events in Asia